Ganoderma multipileum, commonly known as lingzhi or chizhi, is a species of polypore mushroom found in tropical Asia. It has been used as a medicinal mushroom for over 2000 years. Formerly known as Ganoderma lucidum, phylogenetic analyses published in 2009 revealed that G. lucidum is primarily a European species, and that the name has been incorrectly applied to Asian collections.

References

External links
"Ganoderma multipileum, the correct name for G. lucidum in tropical Asia" at ResearchGate
G. multipileum at Index Fungorum

Ganodermataceae
Medicinal fungi